John Watson Crockett Jr. (May 17, 1818 – June 20, 1874) was prominent Confederate politician. He was born in Jessamine County, Kentucky. He represented the state in the First Confederate Congress.

References
John Watkins Crockett Jr. at The Political Graveyard

1818 births
1874 deaths
People from Jessamine County, Kentucky
Members of the Confederate House of Representatives from Kentucky
19th-century American politicians
People from Henderson County, Kentucky